SFRO (Sveriges fordonsbyggares riksorganisation) is a Swedish national organisation founded in 1982 with the goal of making it possible to register amateur built vehicles. The goal of SFRO is to help builders to build their own vehicles and register them for road use. The types of vehicles SFRO handles are rebuilt vehicles (like hot rods, lowriders and so on) and amateur built vehicles (specials or kit cars). SFRO can also inspect imported vehicles that it otherwise wouldn't be possible to import. They are then regarded as rebuilt vehicles.

See also
 Tractor § EPA tractors in Sweden—cars and trucks converted for road-and-farm dual use

External links
 SFRO

Vehicle modification
Clubs and societies in Sweden
Motor clubs